Michael Purefoy (1562–1627) was an English politician who sat in the House of Commons in 1584 and from 1621 to 1622.

Purefoy was the son  of Thomas Purefoy of Caldecot and his wife Elizabeth Bradshaw, daughter of Robert Bradshaw of Morborne, Huntingdonshire. He matriculated from Peterhouse, Cambridge in 1576 and received BA from Magdalene College, Cambridge in 1582 and MA in 1585. In 1584, he was elected Member of Parliament for Clitheroe. He was incorporated at Oxford University in 1598 and was a deputy official of the archdeaconry of Nottinghamshire  from 1598. In 1521 he was elected MP for Nottingham. 
 
Purefoy died unmarried in 1627 and was buried in Caldecote church, where a monument was erected by his cousin  Gamaliel Purefoy.

References

1562 births
1627 deaths
Alumni of Magdalene College, Cambridge
Alumni of Peterhouse, Cambridge
English MPs 1584–1585
English MPs 1621–1622